The Internal Security Corps (KBW) was a special-purpose military formation in Poland under democratic government, established by the  Council of Ministers on 24 May 1945.

History
The KBW consisted of 10 new cavalry regiments, an infantry division, and two buffer brigades. The corps itself was subordinate to the Ministry of Public Security. By the end of August 1945, its force was made up of 29,053 soldiers and 2,356 officers. The KBW was called forth to protect key public infrastructure such as railways, but mainly to combat and suppress the anti-Communist resistance in Poland, including activities of the "Cursed soldiers" as well as all organizations which continued their armed struggle against the Communist takeover, such as the Freedom and Independence (WiN), the National Armed Forces (NSZ), and the remnants of the Polish Home Army (AK) among others. 

Between 1945 and 1954, the KBW fell under the responsibility of Minister Jakub Berman of the Politburo, who was in charge of the Ministry of Public Security. Later, it was part of the Ministry of Internal Affairs. Between March 1945 and April 1947 alone, units of the KBW killed over 1,500 "Cursed soldiers", wounded 301, and apprehended 12,200 others.

In 1965, the KBW was renamed the Wojska Obrony Wewnętrznej ("Internal Defense Force"). It was included in the framework of National Defense. Also, in 1962, the Silesian Unit of the Engineering Army (KBW-4) built roads in the Bieszczady region in the extreme south-east of Poland, strategically important but an uninhabited area.

Commanding officers

March 1945 – May 1945: Col. Henryk Toruńczyk
Jun 1945 – September 1946: Gen. Bolesław Kieniewicz
1946–1948: Brigadier General Konrad Świetlik
1948–1951: Brigadier General Juliusz Hibner (born Dawid Szwarc)
1 March 1951 – 12 March 1965: Brigadier General Włodzimierz Muś
12 March 1965 – 1 July 1965: Brigadier General Bronisław Kuriata

See also
 Internal Troops – Soviet model for the Internal Security Corps.
 Ministry of Public Security of Poland
 Operation Vistula (1947)
 Zygmunt Bauman

References

External links

Narodowe Siły Zbrojne
 The Doomed soldiers – Polish Underground Soldiers 1944–1963 – The Untold Story
 Antykomunistyczne Podziemie Zbrojne po 1944 roku
 National Armed Forces Historical Brief

1945 establishments in Poland
Military of Poland
Stalinism in Poland